A Breath of Snow and Ashes is the sixth book in the Outlander series of novels by Diana Gabaldon. Centered on time travelling 20th century doctor Claire Fraser and her 18th century Scottish Highlander warrior husband Jamie Fraser, the books contain elements of historical fiction, romance, adventure and fantasy.

Plot summary

Claire is the wife of Jamie Fraser, her 18th century husband, and facing the politics and turmoil of the forthcoming American Revolution. The preceding novel, The Fiery Cross, concluded with political unrest in the colonies beginning to boil over and the Frasers trying to peacefully live on their isolated homestead in the foothills of North Carolina. Jamie is suddenly faced with walking between the fires of loyalty to the oath he swore to the British crown and following his hope for freedom in the new world.

Characters 

Claire Beauchamp Randall Fraser - The series' main character. Claire was a British combat nurse during World War II who traveled back through time and originally met Jamie Fraser in 1743 Scotland. Trained as a surgeon in 1968 Boston, she traveled back in time to reunite with Jamie Fraser. Married to Jamie and mother of Brianna, foster mother of Fergus, and stepmother to Marsali.

James "Jamie" MacKenzie Fraser - Laird of Fraser's Ridge, North Carolina. Former inmate of Ardsmuir Prison. Claire's 18th century husband who was a Scottish Jacobite leader, later printer & smuggler, and foster father of Fergus-Claudel Fraser, stepfather of Marsali MacKimmie Fraser, and biological father of Brianna and William (although William was conceived out of wedlock and does not know that Jamie is his real father).

Brianna “Bree” Randall Fraser MacKenzie - Jamie and Claire's daughter born in the 20th century and raised by Claire and Frank Randall. Graduates from MIT after transferring from the Harvard University history program. An "inventor" who likes to make things that she knew in the 20th century. She marries Roger and they have two children: a son, Jeremiah, known as "Jemmy", and a daughter, Amanda (Mandy).

Roger MacKenzie Wakefield - Jamie and Claire's son-in-law who, like Brianna, was born in the 20th century. An Oxford history professor who leaves his life and career behind to follow Brianna.  Married to Brianna and father of Jemmy and Mandy.

Jeremiah "Jemmy" MacKenzie - Roger and Brianna's son (there was some doubt about his paternity but this is now resolved).

Amanda "Mandy" MacKenzie - Roger and Brianna's daughter.

Fergus Claudel Fraser - One-time French pickpocket and spy. Jamie and Claire's foster son. First appears in Dragonfly in Amber. Married to Marsali.

Marsali Mackenzie Fraser - Laoghaire's daughter and Jamie and Claire's stepdaughter. First appears in Voyager. Married to Fergus and mother to Germain, Joan, Félicite and Henri Christian.

Germain Fraser - Fergus and Marsali's oldest son.

Ian Murray - Jenny and Ian Murray's son and Jamie's nephew. Was married to 'Emily' Works With Her Hands of the Mohawk, but returns to the Ridge with only Rollo, his half-wolf canine companion.

Lizzie Wemyss - Brianna's bond servant. Joseph Wemyss' daughter. 'Married' to the Beardsley twins, and pregnant by one of them but unsure which one.

Josiah "Jo" Beardsley - an identical twin who was raised, malnourished, by a cruel man named Beardsley after his family died crossing the Atlantic as indentured servants. He moves with his twin to Fraser's Ridge on New Year's Eve. Falls in love with Lizzie Wemyss.

Keziah "Kezzie" Beardsley - an identical twin who is somewhat deaf. Runs a tannery with his twin. Falls in love with Lizzie Wemyss.

Joseph Wemyss - Jamie and Claire's bond servant. Lizzie's father.

Malva Christie - Tom Christie's daughter. Arrives at the Ridge at the end of The Fiery Cross.

Allan Christie - Tom Christie's son. Arrives at the Ridge at the end of The Fiery Cross.

Tom Christie - A former inmate of Ardsmuir Prison. Malva and Alan's Father. In love with Claire. Arrives at the Ridge at the end of The Fiery Cross.

Colonel Lord John William Grey - The former governor of Ardsmuir Prison. Jamie's long-time friend, they first met in 1745 during the Jacobite rising. Stepfather of William Ransom, 9th Earl of Ellesmere.

Jocasta MacKenzie Cameron Innes - Sister of Ellen MacKenzie Fraser, Colum and Dougal MacKenzie. Jamie's blind aunt who owns River Run Plantation.

Duncan Innes - A former inmate of Ardsmuir Prison. Jocasta's husband.

Stephen Bonnet - An outlaw, pirate, thief, trader, rapist, and smuggler who first appears in Drums of Autumn. Smuggles goods along the Carolina coastlines. He was shot by Brianna at the end of The Fiery Cross. Fate unknown.

Amy McCallum - A young widow and a new resident of Fraser's Ridge. Mother of Aidan and Orrie McCallum. Roger MacKenzie tries to help her which causes talk on the Ridge that he and Amy are having an affair.

Reception
A Breath of Snow and Ashes debuted at #1 on The New York Times Hardcover Fiction Best-Seller List in 2005 and won the Quill Award for Science Fiction/Fantasy/Horror.

References

External links 
 
 
 Excerpt from A Breath of Snow and Ashes

2005 American novels
2005 fantasy novels
Outlander (franchise)
Hispanic and Latino American novels
Novels set in the 1770s
Novels set in the 18th century
Novels set in the American colonial era
Novels set during the American Revolutionary War
Fiction set in 1773
Fiction set in 1774
Fiction set in 1775
Fiction set in 1776
Novels set in North Carolina